Bibarba is a genus of loach that is found in the Chengjiang River and Hongshuihe River in China.

Species
There are currently 2 recognized species in this genus:
 Bibarba bibarba Y. X. Chen & Y. F. Chen, 2007
 Bibarba parvoculus T. J. Wu, Jian Yang & L. H. Xiu, 2015

References 

Cobitidae
Fish of Asia
Freshwater fish of China